Route 111 is a  state highway in Massachusetts, a continuation of New Hampshire Route 111. The route has a north–south component and an east–west one, though it is signed exclusively as a north–south route on newer signs. The east–west portion of the route largely follows the path of the Union Turnpike, built in the early 19th century to connect the communities of Leominster and Concord. (A few older east–west directional signs still exist east of Harvard.)

Route description
Route 111 begins in Concord at the rotary junction of Route 2, Route 2A and Route 119, next to Massachusetts Correctional Institution – Concord. The route is concurrent along Union Turnpike with Route 2 for the first  into Acton, before Route 2 heads northwestward, beginning its western highway portion. Route 111 continues along Massachusetts Avenue, having a junction with Route 27 not far from the split. The split is Exit 118 (old exit 43).

Route 111 continues relatively westward along Massachusetts Avenue through Boxborough, meeting I-495 at Exit 28, just before entering Harvard. In Harvard, the route leaves Massachusetts Avenue at its far western end, looping around until it meets Route 110 at that town's center. The two routes continue northward, crossing Route 2 at exit 38, before continuing northward, east of Fort Devens into Ayer. In Ayer, Route 111 splits from Route 110 as that route turns eastward with Route 2A Eastbound, while Route 111 turns westbound along that route, passing concurrently with it along Ayer's Main Street.

After turning northward again, Routes 111 and 2A split, just west of Moore Army Air Field, with Route 111 turning more northerly into Groton. In Groton, Route 111 joins Route 225 near the center of town, with the two of them meeting Route 119. At this point, Route 225 joins Route 119 eastbound while Route 111 joins Route 119 west bound. The two routes head northwestward and cross the Nashua River into the town of Pepperell concurrently. Once in Pepperell, Route 111 turns northward again, running in roughly the same direction as the river. It crosses Route 113 near the center of Pepperell before continuing northward as it enters Hollis, New Hampshire and becomes New Hampshire Route 111.

Major intersections

See also

References

External links

111
Transportation in Middlesex County, Massachusetts
Transportation in Worcester County, Massachusetts